Abraham Eraly (15 August 1934 — 8 April 2015) was an Indian writer of history, a teacher, and the founder of Chennai-based magazine Aside.

Early life
Abraham Eraly was born in the village of Ayyampalli in Ernakulam district, Kerala on 15 August 1934. He studied history at a college in Ernakulam and followed it up with a postgraduate degree in the same subject at Madras Christian College in Chennai. He became a professor of history at MCC in 1971.

Bored with the monotony of teaching, Eraly resigned his professorship in 1977 and founded the Chennai-based magazine Aside, India's first English-language city magazine. Following financial difficulties, it closed in 1997.

Literary career
Eraly's earliest publications were poems and short stories.

Abraham Early in an interview with journalist and author, talks to Shreekumar Varma says:

His historical writing career started while at Madras Christian College. Dissatisfied with the material he used to teach history, he began to write a series of books on Indian history. The Gem in the Lotus covered its earliest period, while The Last Spring continued the narration to the end of the Mughal Empire.  Eraly's style of historical story-telling made him particularly approachable for non-historians but could also be used as a reliable source on the Mughal period in India.

Later life
In 2011, Eraly moved to Pondicherry, where he lived in Sarathambal Nagar.

Abraham Eraly died at the JIPMER hospital on 8 April 2015, following a paralytic attack.

Bibliography

Non-fiction
 The Age of Wrath: A History of the Delhi Sultanate, 2014, Penguin UK, 
 The First Spring: The Golden Age of India, 2011, Penguin Books India, 
 Gem In The Lotus: The Seeding Of Indian Civilisation, 2002, Penguin UK, 
 The Last Spring: The Lives and Times of Great Mughals, 2000, Penguin UK, 
The Mughal Throne: The Saga of India's Great Emperors, 2004, Phoenix  
The Mughal world : life in India's last golden age, 2007,  Penguin Books, 

Many of his books were divided and re-published under different names leading to multiple titles. The Last Spring: The Lives and Times of Great Mughals was re-published in two parts: The Last Spring Part I (alternatively known as The Mughal Throne and Emperors Of The Peacock Throne) and The Last Spring Part II (alternatively known as The Mughal World).

Fiction
 Night of the Dark Tree: A Novel, 2006, Penguin Books India, 
 Tales Once Told: Legends of Kerala, 2006, Penguin Books India,

References

External links
 Abraham Eraly's articles for Outlook India

Writers from Kochi
1934 births
2015 deaths
People from Ernakulam district
Indian editors
21st-century Indian historians
21st-century Indian novelists
20th-century Indian short story writers
20th-century Indian poets
Poets from Kerala
Scholars from Kerala
Novelists from Kerala